Bingo O'Malley (May 10, 1933 - June 2, 2019) was an American actor. He has been called "Pittsburgh’s finest actor."

Biography
O'Malley never revealed his birth name. He initially aspired to the priesthood but found that "I am not religious." He then spent years as a juvenile-probation officer as well as a school social worker. It was while working as a Navy radarman in Key West that O'Malley got his first role in a community theater production of The Rainmaker in the 1950s.

By the 1970s, O'Malley was working with a community theater in Churchill, Pennsylvania as well as the Pittsburgh Lab Theatre. For the next two decades O'Malley was one of the city's busiest actors.

On film, O'Malley appeared in fellow Pittsburgher George A. Romero's Knightriders as well as Creepshow and  Two Evil Eyes. He also appeared in My Bloody Valentine 3D and Super 8.

Filmography

Film

Television

References

External links
 
 A Remembrance of Bingo O'Malley: 1933–2019

American film actors
Male actors from Pittsburgh
1933 births
2019 deaths